Melese peruviana is a moth of the family Erebidae. It was described by Walter Rothschild in 1909. It is found in Peru.

References

Melese
Moths described in 1909